James Gilmour (January 20, 1842 – May 15, 1908) was a Scottish-born farmer and political figure in Ontario, Canada. He represented Middlesex East in the House of Commons of Canada from 1896 to 1904 as a Conservative.

He was born in South Hillhead, Renfrewshire and was educated there. In 1871, he married Elizabeth McClary. He was warden for Middlesex County in 1879 and also served as a trustee for London County General Hospital. Gilmour was reeve of North Dorchester Township for 15 years.

References 

Members of the House of Commons of Canada from Ontario
Conservative Party of Canada (1867–1942) MPs
1842 births
1908 deaths